Timofei Savvich Morozov (23 January, 1823, Moscow - 10 October, 1889) was Russian business person active in the later period of the Russian Empire. He was part of the influential Old Believer family, the Morozovs. He was appointed head of the Moscow Duma in 1866.

Timofei was one of a small number of entrepreneurs who used to attend meetings of the Russian Technical Society.

Family
Timofei married Maria Feodorovna Simonova in 1846. Together they had six children:
 Anna Timofeyevna Morozova Karpova (1849–1924), married the historian Gennady Fedorovich Karpov
 Ivan Timofeyevich Morozov (1855–1858), child death
 Arseny Timofeyevich Morozov (1857–1858), child death
 Yulia Timofeyevna Krestovnikova (1858–1920), married the industrialist, Grigory Aleksandrovich Krestovnikov
 Sergey Timofeevich Morozov (1860–1944)
 Savva Timofeyevich Morozov (1862–1905)

References

1823 births
1889 deaths